Stuorrajekna is the largest glacier in Sweden, with an area of . It is located in the Sulitjelma massif in the southeastern Padjelanta National Park in Lapland.

References
 

Glaciers of Sweden
Lapland (Sweden)
Landforms of Norrbotten County